Amandine Homo (born 24 December 1980) is a former French athlete who specialized in the pole vault.  She is the older sister of Sébastien Homo,  who is also a pole vaulter.  Amandine Homo competed for the Dynamic Aulnay Club for which she trains children since her retirement.

Career

Prize list

Records

Notes and references

External links  
 

1980 births
Living people
French female pole vaulters
Place of birth missing (living people)